George Anthony Bartlett (born 14 March 1998) is an English cricketer who plays for Somerset County Cricket Club. He made his first-class debut for the county in the 2017 County Championship against Warwickshire on 5 September 2017. He made his List A debut on 24 April 2019, for Somerset in the 2019 Royal London One-Day Cup. He made his Twenty20 debut on 30 August 2020, for Somerset in the 2020 t20 Blast.

References

External links
 
 

1998 births
Living people
English cricketers
Somerset cricketers
Cricketers from Frimley
People educated at Millfield